Catherine MacLellan is a Canadian folk singer-songwriter, based in Prince Edward Island.

Early life
The daughter of Canadian songwriter Gene MacLellan, MacLellan was born in Burlington, Ontario but raised in Summerside, Prince Edward Island.

Before beginning her solo recording career, she sang with The New Drifts, a four-piece band featuring Island musicians James Phillips (guitar, mandolin), Stéphane Bouchard (bass) and Dave Gould (drums & percussion). She spent time working at the box office of Summerside's Harbourfront Jubilee Theatre.

Career

MacLellan released two albums, 2004's Dark Dream Midnight and 2006's Church Bell Blues, independently before signing to True North Records, which rereleased Church Bell Blues in 2007. She followed up with Water in the Ground in 2009; Dark Dream Midnight was included as a bonus disc with physical copies of that album. She toured Canada, the United States and the United Kingdom throughout 2009 to support the album, including performances on CBC Radio's Canada Live and The Vinyl Cafe.  Her album Silhouette was released by True North Records in July 2011.  Her album "The Raven's Sun" was released August 2014.

She has also participated in two collaborative "Canadian Songbook" tours: in 2008 with Murray McLauchlan, Stephen Fearing and Paul Quarrington, and in 2009 with McLauchlan, Barney Bentall and Nathan Rogers.

In November 2009, she recorded a new song, "Singing Sands", for CBC Radio 2's Great Canadian Song Quest.

In 2014 MacLellan released her first independent record since signing with True North, The Raven's Sun.  The record was recorded in Woodstock, New York at Hidden Quarry Studio, Engineered by Danny Blume, and produced by MacLellan's long-time musical partner Chris Gauthier. The Raven's Sun was received with critical-acclaim and won many awards including a 2015 JUNO award.

In 2017 she made a record on True North records with songs of her father Gene MacLellan. This record was named after the LP her father recorded in 1977 If It's Alright With You. This album tied in with a show by the same name in the summer of 2017 that MacLellan wrote based on her father's life and music.

In 2019 she self-produced and released a new record, Coyote, which she pronounces kahy-oh-tee

Personal life
MacLellan was formerly married to singer-songwriter Al Tuck, now divorced, with whom she has a daughter, Isabel.

Discography
Dark Dream Midnight (2004)
Church Bell Blues (2006)
Water in the Ground (2009)
Silhouette (2011)
The Raven's Sun (2014)
If it's alright with you – The songs of Gene MacLellan (2017)
Coyote (2019)

Awards and achievements
2015 JUNO Award - Contemporary Roots Album Of the Year 
2012 East Coast Music Awards & Nominations:
Folk Recording of the Year – Winner
Album of the Year
Solo Recording of the Year
2010 East Coast Music Awards & Nominations:
Female Solo Recording of the Year – Winner
Folk Recording of the Year – Winner
SOCAN Songwriter of the Year
Winner for English Songwriter of the Year at 2012 Canadian Folk Music Awards
Winner for Solo Artist of the Year at 2009 Canadian Folk Music Awards

References

External links
Catherine MacLellan

Canadian women singer-songwriters
Canadian folk singer-songwriters
Juno Award for Roots & Traditional Album of the Year – Solo winners
Musicians from Halifax, Nova Scotia
Musicians from Ontario
Musicians from Prince Edward Island
People from Burlington, Ontario
People from Summerside, Prince Edward Island
Living people
Year of birth missing (living people)
Canadian Folk Music Award winners